East of Eden may refer to:

 The biblical location of the Land of Nod, where Cain was exiled

Literature 
 East of Eden (novel), a 1952 novel by John Steinbeck
 East of Eden, a 1939 novel by Israel Joshua Singer

Film and television 
 East of Eden (film), a 1955 adaptation of the Steinbeck novel
 East of Eden, a 1988 Syrian documentary film by Omar Amiralay
 East of Eden (miniseries), a 1981 American TV miniseries adaptation of the Steinbeck novel
 East of Eden (TV series), a 2008 South Korean drama series

Music 
 East of Eden (band), a British progressive rock band, or a 1971 album by the band
 East of Eden (album), by Taken by Trees, 2009
 "East of Eden" (Big Country song), 1984
 "East of Eden" (Zella Day song), 2014
 "East of Eden", a song by Babyshambles, a B-side of the single "Fuck Forever", 2005
 "East of Eden", a song by Dead Can Dance from Dead Can Dance, 1984
 "East of Eden", a song by Lone Justice from Lone Justice, 1985
 "East of Eden", a song by Mason Jennings from Century Spring, 2002

See also 
 "East of Eden, West of Memphis", a song by Spock's Beard from Feel Euphoria
 East of Eden's Gate, a 1982 album by Billy Thorpe
 Eden of the East, a 2009 Japanese anime television series
 Far East of Eden, or Tengai Makyo, a Japanese roleplaying video game series